Marc Kibong Mbamba (born 15 October 1988) is a Cameroonian footballer who plays as a midfielder.

External links

1988 births
Footballers from Douala
Living people
Cameroonian footballers
Association football midfielders
Adanaspor footballers
Konyaspor footballers
Boluspor footballers
MKE Ankaragücü footballers
Denizlispor footballers
Ankaraspor footballers
Süper Lig players
TFF First League players
Cameroonian expatriate footballers
Expatriate footballers in Turkey
Cameroonian expatriate sportspeople in Turkey